The main legal act establishing and regulating taxation in Kazakhstan is the Code of the Republic of Kazakhstan On Taxes and Other Obligatory Payments to the Budget (the “Tax Code”).  The Tax Code was adopted on 10 December 2008 and came into effect as of 1 January 2009.

Historical Development 
Kazakhstan declared its sovereignty as a member of the USSR in October 1990, and following the dissolution of the Soviet Union the country declared independence in December 1991. The first piece of Tax Legislation of the sovereign republic was the 1991 decree “On Taxes from Enterprises, Associations and Organizations”.

In 1995 the President issued a Decree “On Taxes and Other Obligatory Payments to the Budget" (the “Decree”), which regulated the tax system in Kazakhstan. The Decree only provided for general information on taxes and referred to several instructions which provided for specific information on each of the taxes.

In 2002 the Code of the Republic of Kazakhstan On Taxes and Other Obligatory Payments to the Budget (the “2002 Tax Code”) came into force. The 2002 Tax Code was a more comprehensive legal act than the Decree.  In fact, the 2002 Tax Code regulated the relationships between the state and the taxpayer and provided for procedures on calculation and payment of taxes.

In 2008 the President announced that the Republic of Kazakhstan requires a new tax code, which should provide for lower tax rates and simplified tax administration procedures.  As a result, the Code of the Republic of Kazakhstan On Taxes and Other Obligatory Payments to the Budget (the “Tax Code”) was adopted on 10 December 2008 and came into force as of 1 January 2009.

Types of Taxes

References

(Russian) Chamber of Kazakh Tax Advisers

Economy of Kazakhstan
Kazakhstan
Law of Kazakhstan